Avignonet is a commune in the Isère department in the Auvergne-Rhône-Alpes region of south-eastern France.

The inhabitants of the commune are known as Avignonetins or Avignonetines.

Geography
Avignonet is located some 25 km south of Grenoble and 8 km north of Monestier-de-Clermont. Access to the commune is by the A51 autoroute (E712) which passes south through the western arm of the commune and has Exit  Sinard on the commune border. Access to the village is by road D110A from Saint-Martin-de-la-Cluze in the north which comes down the western border of the commune to the village. The D110C goes east from Sinard to the dam through the south of the commune. Avignonet station has rail connections to Toulouse, Carcassonne and Narbonne. Apart from the village there are the hamlets of Le Cros and Le Mas in the south-east. There are large forests in the east of the commune with the rest of the commune farmland.

The eastern border of the commune is entirely formed by the Drac river and the large artificial Monteynard lake formed by the dam on the Drac river. Several streams rise in the commune and flow east to the lake including the Ruisseau d'Aiguettas, the Ruisseau de Mitraire, the Ruisseau de la Proche, and the Ruisseau des Vaux which forms part of the northern border.

Neighbouring communes and villages

Administration

List of Successive Mayors

Demography
In 2017 the commune had 197 inhabitants. In 1962 its population peaked at 951, which was due to construction workers for the Lac de Monteynard-Avignonet reservoir.

Culture and heritage

Civil heritage
The Lac de Monteynard-Avignonet with its Dam and Hydro-electricity plant.
Ruins of the Chateau d'Ars
The Chateau des marceaux from the 17th century

Former Chateaux
Chateau La Cluse
Chateau des seigneurs du Gua

See also
Communes of the Isère department

References

External links
Photos of Avignonet 
Bell Towers website 
Avignonet on Géoportail, National Geographic Institute (IGN) website 
Avignonet on the 1750 Cassini Map

Communes of Isère
Dauphiné